Santa Fe (Regionally pronounced as "SAN-tuh FEE") is an unincorporated community in Maury County, Tennessee, United States. Its ZIP code is 38482.

History
A post office called Santa Fe was established in 1849. Variant names were "Benton" and "Pinhook." The name "Santa Fe" was adopted when the post office opened.

Notes

Unincorporated communities in Maury County, Tennessee
Unincorporated communities in Tennessee